A videophone is a telecommunication device that provides both live audio and video on a telephone call, letting each person see as well as talk to the other.

Videophone, video phone or Video Phone may also refer to:

 Video door-phone, a stand-alone intercom system used to manage calls made at the entrance to a building with access controlled by audiovisual communication between the inside and outside
 "Video Phone" (song), a 2008 song by R&B singer Beyoncé, which was later remixed in a version featuring Lady Gaga